Thomas Coupar (1862 – unknown) was a Scottish footballer who played in the Football League for Bolton Wanderers.

1888-1889
Thomas Coupar made his League debut, and played at centre-forward, on 8 September 1888 at Pike's Lane, the then home of Bolton Wanderers. The opposition was Derby County. Bolton Wanderers lost the match 6–3. Thomas Coupar scored his debut and only League goal on 15 September 1888 at Pike's Lane, when the opposition were Burnley. Thomas Coupar scored the third of Bolton Wanderers three goals in the match. Bolton Wanderers lost 4–3. Thomas Coupar played in three of 22 League games played by Bolton Wanderers in season 1888–89. He scored one League goal. He also played as a forward in a front-line that scored three-League-goals-or-more in a match on two occasions.

References

1862 births
Date of death unknown
Scottish footballers
Bolton Wanderers F.C. players
English Football League players
Association football forwards